Ozark High School may refer to:

 Ozark High School (Arkansas), Ozark, Arkansas
 Ozark High School (Missouri), Ozark, Missouri